Harbour Heights is a census-designated place (CDP) in Charlotte County, Florida, United States. The population was 3,428 at the 2020 census. It is part of the Sarasota-Bradenton-Punta Gorda Combined Statistical Area.

Geography
Harbour Heights is located in northern Charlotte County at  (26.990210, -82.005325), on the northwest side of the Peace River. Harbor View Road connects the community to Interstate 75,  to the southwest.

Demographics

As of the census of 2000, there were 2,873 people, 1,243 households, and 919 families residing in the CDP. The racial makeup of the CDP was 93.70% White, 2.85% African American, 0.03% Native American, 0.77% Asian, 0.07% Pacific Islander, 0.73% from other races, and 1.84% from two or more races. Hispanic or Latino of any race were 3.83% of the population.

There were 1,243 households, out of which 21.0% had children under the age of 18 living with them, 62.8% were married couples living together, 8.2% had a female householder with no husband present, and 26.0% were non-families. 20.8% of all households were made up of individuals, and 12.8% had someone living alone who was 65 years of age or older.  The average household size was 2.31 and the average family size was 2.64.

In the CDP, the population was spread out, with 18.2% under the age of 18, 4.7% from 18 to 24, 19.2% from 25 to 44, 27.0% from 45 to 64, and 30.9% who were 65 years of age or older.  The median age was 51 years. For every 100 females, there were 87.7 males.  For every 100 females age 18 and over, there were 86.0 males.

The median income for a household in the CDP was $44,394, and the median income for a family was $47,025. Males had a median income of $31,825 versus $21,173 for females. The per capita income for the CDP was $22,547.  About 1.8% of families and 2.7% of the population were below the poverty line, including none of those under age 18 and 3.7% of those age 65 or over.

References

Census-designated places in Charlotte County, Florida
Census-designated places in Florida